The Bahamas International Championships or Bahamas Championships was a defunct men's tennis tournament founded in 1922. It was played on outdoor clay courts at the  New Colonial Hotel Courts, Nassau, Bahamas until 1936.

History
In 1922 a Bahamas International Championships was founded and financed by the American banker William Henry Crocker, and was played on outdoor clay courts at the New Colonial Hotel Courts, Nassau, Bahamas. That first Bahamas International tournament was part of the Caribbean Circuit and staged though till 1936 when it was discontinued.

In 1972 a second Bahamas International Open tournament was founded again in Nassau, but was played on outdoor hard courts. In 1975 that tournament moved to Freeport for one edition only before returning to Nassau until 1980 when the tournament was discontinued.

Past finals
Incomplete roll

References

Clay court tennis tournaments
Defunct tennis tournaments in the Bahamas